No. 11 UAV Flight Squadron of the Sri Lanka Air Force is an independent flight operating in the reconnaissance role using unmanned aerial vehicles. The squadron was reformed into No. 111 and No. 112 on 1 June 2008.

Aircraft operated
RQ-2 Pioneer
IAI Scout
IAI Searcher
Searcher MKII

References

Military units and formations established in 1998
11 Flight